Osaterone acetate, sold under the brand name Ypozane, is a medication which is used in veterinary medicine in Europe in the treatment of enlarged prostate in dogs. It is given by mouth.

Osaterone acetate is an antiandrogen, and hence is an antagonist of the androgen receptor, the biological target of androgens like testosterone and dihydrotestosterone. It is also a progestin, or a synthetic progestogen, and hence is an agonist of the progesterone receptor, the biological target of progestogens like progesterone.

Osaterone acetate was introduced for veterinary use in 2007. It is marketed in Europe.

Uses

Veterinary
Osaterone acetate is used in veterinary medicine in Europe in the treatment of benign prostatic hyperplasia (BPH) in dogs. It has been found to produce remission of clinical symptoms of BPH in 83% of dogs for six months after a single one-week course of treatment, and can be used long-term.

Available forms
Osaterone acetate comes in the form of 1.875 mg, 3.75 mg, 7.5 mg, and 15 mg oral tablets for veterinary use.

Side effects
Side effects of osaterone acetate include diminished sperm quality (for up to 6 weeks post-treatment), transient elevation of liver enzymes (caution should be observed with known liver disease), vomiting, diarrhea, polyuria/polydipsia, lethargy, and hyperplasia of the mammary glands. It can also decrease cortisol levels, interfere with adrenocorticotropic hormone response, induce or exacerbate adrenal insufficiency, and exacerbate diabetes mellitus.

Pharmacology

Pharmacodynamics
Osaterone acetate is a steroidal antiandrogen, progestin, and antigonadotropin. It has virtually no estrogenic or androgenic activity. Its side-effect profile indicates that it possesses clinically relevant glucocorticoid activity. An active metabolite of osaterone acetate, 15β-hydroxyosaterone acetate, has potent antiandrogenic activity similarly to osaterone acetate. Osaterone acetate treats BPH in dogs by reducing the actions of androgens in the prostate gland.

Pharmacokinetics
The major active metabolite of osaterone acetate is 15β-hydroxyosaterone acetate. Osaterone acetate has a long biological half-life of 80 hours to 197 ± 109 hours in dogs.

Chemistry

Osaterone acetate, also known as 2-oxachloromadinone acetate, as well as 17α-acetoxy-6-chloro-2-oxa-6-dehydroprogesterone or 17α-acetoxy-6-chloro-2-oxapregna-4,6-diene-3,20-dione, is a synthetic pregnane steroid and a derivative of progesterone and 17α-hydroxyprogesterone. It is a derivative of the less potent chlormadinone acetate. The medication is the C17α acetate ester of osaterone.

History
Osaterone acetate was introduced for veterinary use in Europe under the brand name Ypozane in 2007.

Society and culture

Generic names
Osaterone acetate is the generic name of the drug.

Brand names
Osaterone acetate is marketed under the brand name Ypozane by Virbac.

Availability
Osaterone acetate is available widely throughout Europe, including in Belgium, Finland, France, Germany, Italy, the Netherlands, Norway, Poland, Sweden, Switzerland, and the United Kingdom.

Research
Osaterone acetate was also investigated in Japan in the treatment of prostate cancer and BPH in humans but was ultimately never marketed for such purposes.

References

Further reading

External links 
 Ypozane - Virbac 
 Ypozane (Osaterone Acetate) - European Medicines Agency

Acetate esters
Antiandrogen esters
Antigonadotropins
Dog medications
Drugs for benign prostatic hyperplasia
Glucocorticoids
Hepatotoxins
Lactones
Organochlorides
Pregnanes
Progestogen esters
Progestogens
Steroidal antiandrogens